Windmill End railway station was a station on the former Great Western Railway's  Bumble Hole Line between Blowers Green and Old Hill.

It opened in 1878, was destaffed in 1952 and closed in 1964. Its name was immortalised in that year as the closing words of the song "Slow Train" by Flanders and Swann. The railway, however, remained open for another four years.

The site of the railway and the station had been obliterated by the end of the 1970s. It has now been largely reclaimed by nature.

References

Further reading

Disused railway stations in Dudley
Railway stations in Great Britain opened in 1878
Railway stations in Great Britain closed in 1964
Beeching closures in England
Former Great Western Railway stations